Afroneta snazelli is a species of sheet weaver found in Ethiopia. It was described by Merrett & Russell-Smith in 1996.

References

Endemic fauna of Ethiopia
Linyphiidae
Spiders described in 1996
Spiders of Africa
Fauna of Ethiopia